Bayancholi-ye Kord (also Romanized as Bayāncholī-ye Kord) is a village in Qarah Quyun-e Shomali Rural District, in the Central District of Showt County, West Azerbaijan Province, Iran. At the 2006 census, its population was 33, in 7 families.

References 

Populated places in Showt County